The 1900 Washington football team was an American football team that represented the University of Washington during the 1900 college football season. In its first season under coach J. S. Dodge, the team compiled a 1–2–2 record and outscored its opponents by a combined total of 71 to 21. W. H. Corson was the team captain.

Schedule

References

Washington
Washington Huskies football seasons
Washington football